Teterevyatka is a rural locality (a selo) and the administrative center of Teterevyatskoye Rural Settlement, Zhirnovsky District, Volgograd Oblast, Russia. The population was 392 as of 2010. There are 8 streets.

Geography 
Teterevyatka is located 71 km southeast of Zhirnovsk (the district's administrative centre) by road. Borodachi is the nearest rural locality.

References 

Rural localities in Zhirnovsky District